In Bangladesh, a ward is an optional division of a city or town, especially an electoral district, for administrative and representative purposes. It is an elective unit of a City Corporation or Municipal Corporation, created for the purpose of providing more direct representation, from which a single council member is elected.

See also 
 Ward (electoral subdivision)
 Wards of Sylhet City Corporation

Subdivisions of Bangladesh
Fifth-level administrative divisions by country